Deborah Joy LeVine is an American television writer and producer who  wrote the TV series, Lois & Clark: The New Adventures of Superman, which ran from 1993 to 1997.

Filmography
 Murder: By Reason of Insanity (associate producer) (1985)
 Samaritan: The Mitch Snyder Story (producer) (1986)
 Equal Justice (writer) (1990-1991) (executive story consultant) (1991)
 Something to Live for: The Alison Gertz Story (writer) (1992)
 Lois & Clark: The New Adventures of Superman (creator, writer, co-executive/executive producer, executive consultant) (1993-1997)
 Courthouse (creator, writer, executive producer) (1995) 
 Early Edition (writer, executive producer) (1996-1997)
 Dawson's Creek (executive producer) (1998)
 Any Day Now (creator, writer, executive producer) (1998)
 The Division (creator, writer, executive producer) (2001-2004)
 Class Actions (executive producer) (2004)
 Beautiful People (creative consultant, writer) (2005)
 Kaya (creator, writer, executive producer) (2007) 
 Mental (creator, writer, executive producer) (2009)

External links
 

American television producers
American women television producers
American television writers
Living people
American women television writers
Place of birth missing (living people)
Year of birth missing (living people)
21st-century American women